"Private Laughter" is Bonnie Pink's twenty-first single from the album Even So. The single was released under the Warner Music Japan label on January 21, 2004.

Track listing
Private Laughter
1・2・3
Maze of Love (Gula Session)
Private Laughter (Instrumental)

Charts

Oricon Sales Chart

2004 singles
2004 songs
Warner Music Japan singles